Queen Forever is a compilation album by the British rock band Queen. Released on 10 November 2014, it features tracks the band had "forgotten about" with vocals from original lead singer Freddie Mercury. Queen's bassist John Deacon is also on the tracks.

Drummer Roger Taylor spoke about the album in December 2013, stating that he and guitarist Brian May were "getting together...in the new year to finish what we've got there and then we're going to fashion some kind of album". May announced the title as a compilation album in a radio interview on BBC Radio Wales on 23 May 2014 at the Hay Festival. It is the first Queen album to feature unreleased material from Mercury (who died from complications related to AIDS on 24 November 1991) since the 1995 album Made in Heaven and Deacon (who retired from the music business in 1997) since the 1997 compilation album Queen Rocks.  The album was released by Hollywood Records in the United States on 10 November 2014.

Material
Brian May said most of the material "comes from the 80s, when we were in full flight. It is quite emotional. It is the big, big ballads and the big, big epic sound." He has compared it to Made in Heaven. May had earlier stated that the album may end up being a mixture of old existing material and new material containing at least three unreleased songs, later stating possibly as many as five. The material has been fleshed out with modern technology by May.

"It is a rather odd mixture of our slower stuff," complained Roger Taylor. "I didn't want the double album version they've put out. It's an awful lot for people to take in, and it's bloody miserable. I wouldn't call it an album, either. It's a compilation with three new tracks. It's more of a record company confection. It's not a full-blooded Queen album."

Songs

"Let Me in Your Heart Again"

Originating from sessions for the band's 1984 album The Works, "Let Me in Your Heart Again" was written by May and originally recorded in Los Angeles in 1983. Speaking on The Chris Evans Breakfast Show in September 2014, May revealed that the band had initially found it impossible to complete the track and that several different versions of the lyrics were written to make it easier for Mercury to sing. They abandoned the song, but it was eventually recorded by May's wife Anita Dobson (with May on guitar) and released on her 1988 studio album Talking of Love (Dobson reportedly used the Queen version(s) as a guide vocal). In preparing the track for Queen Forever, May stitched together parts from each of the existing Queen versions, before he and Taylor fleshed out the music track. Consequently, the final studio version contains very different lyrics from the Dobson version.

An alternative remix by William Orbit was released in November 2014 as a single in the UK to raise money for Product Red, an initiative founded in 2006 by U2 lead singer Bono for the purpose of engaging the private sector in raising awareness and funds to help eliminate HIV/AIDS in Africa.

"Love Kills"

It was stated by Adam Lambert at the start of the 2014 Queen + Adam Lambert Tour of North America that "Love Kills", Mercury's debut solo single from 1984, had been reworked by the band for inclusion on Queen Forever. The band then proceeded to play a stripped down ballad version of the track (the original version was noted for its heavily synthesized, disco-esque style).

Queen had previously reworked Mercury's solo recordings into Queen songs for their 1995 album, Made in Heaven. On that occasion, they had used his songs "Made in Heaven" and "I Was Born to Love You", as well as the unreleased solo recording "It's a Beautiful Day". When it became apparent that there was not enough quality unreleased Queen material to make a new full studio album, May and Taylor decided to utilise the same tactics.

Written by Mercury and Giorgio Moroder, "Love Kills" was originally recorded for the band's 1984 studio album The Works, but was ultimately rejected. It was then reworked as a Mercury solo track for inclusion in Moroder's 1984 restoration and edit of the 1927 silent film Metropolis. In 1985, the film was nominated at the 5th Golden Raspberry Awards for Worst Musical Score, and the song itself was nominated for Worst Original Song. Nevertheless, the single reached number ten on the UK Singles Chart.

Despite being released as a Freddie Mercury solo single, all four members of Queen appeared on the original release.

Speaking on The Chris Evans Breakfast Show, May revealed that he had always wanted to turn the song into a ballad, but had never done so before Mercury's death. The new version is led by May's lead guitar, rather than Mercury's original synthesizers. May also plays bass guitar on the track, supplemented by Deacon's additional electric guitar as taken from the original source tapes.

"There Must Be More to Life Than This"

In the early 1980s, Mercury recorded three songs as duets with Michael Jackson, of which "There Must Be More to Life Than This", written by Mercury, was one. The sessions eventually fell apart and ended, and the material was never released (although Mercury stated several times he hoped they would find the time to finish the tracks).

Queen eventually recorded a version of the song in 1981 during sessions for their 1982 studio album Hot Space, but it was ultimately left off the record. Mercury later went on to re-record "There Must Be More to Life Than This" for his solo album Mr. Bad Guy (1985), while Jackson recorded one of the other songs, "State of Shock", with his family band the Jacksons, with Mick Jagger of The Rolling Stones singing Mercury's parts (the song was released as a single in 1984, and later featured on the Jacksons' seventeenth studio album Victory, also released in 1984; this album's title was also that of the third Mercury/Jackson duet, but has itself never been released).

After Jackson's death in 2009, May and Taylor made steps to secure the release of the duets, with a view to a 2012 release. However, according to Taylor, working with the Jackson estate was like "wading through glue". Ultimately, the parties were only able to reach an agreement for this one of the three tracks to be released.

The version released on Queen Forever was produced and mixed by William Orbit, containing the original 1981 backing track recorded during the Hot Space sessions, and features Deacon on bass guitar. An alternative mix made by May exists, but was rejected by the Jackson estate in favour of the Orbit mix.

Other material
The rest of the album consists of previously-released Queen songs. Rather than simply being the "greatest hits", however, the tracks are mostly deeper cuts personally chosen by Taylor and May. The songs were selected to loosely follow the concept of an album centred around the theme of "love".

Critical reception

Upon release, Queen Forever received mixed reviews from critics who thought there was no reason for fans of the band to purchase an album with songs that have been released many times in other Queen compilation albums. Thomas Erlewine gave a two-and-a-half star review in AllMusic, saying: "The hardcore fans might notice the difference but, apart from those three songs, there's not much reason for them to pick this up because Forever consists of songs they've purchased many times over."

CD track listing

Standard Edition

Deluxe Edition

Vinyl release
On 18 February 2015, it was announced that Queen Forever would be released in a 4-LP box set featuring all the tracks on the deluxe edition and a bonus 12" single featuring "Let Me in Your Heart Again (William Orbit Mix)".

On Side B of the bonus 12" single, there is a "Queen Forever" etching.

Personnel
Freddie Mercury – lead vocals, piano, keyboards, acoustic guitar on "Crazy Little Thing Called Love"
Brian May – acoustic and electric guitars, backing vocals, piano, keyboards, lead vocals on "Long Away", "'39" and "Sail Away Sweet Sister", co-lead vocals on "Las Palabras de Amor", "Who Wants to Live Forever" and "Mother Love", bass guitar on "Love Kills"
Roger Taylor – drums, backing vocals, keyboards, lead vocals and rhythm guitar on "Drowse"
John Deacon – bass guitar, acoustic guitars, keyboards, additional electric guitar on "Love Kills"
Michael Jackson – co-lead vocals on "There Must Be More to Life Than This"
Fred Mandel – piano on "Let Me in Your Heart Again"

Charts

Weekly charts

Year-end charts

Certifications

References

2014 compilation albums
Queen (band) compilation albums
Compilation albums published posthumously
Hollywood Records compilation albums
Albums produced by William Orbit
Virgin EMI Records albums